Gabites Glacier is a glacier on the headwall of Caffin Valley,  west of the head of Walker Glacier in the Willett Range of Victoria Land.  It was named by the New Zealand Geographic Board in 2005 after Isobel (Helen) Gabites, a member of the Victoria University's Antarctic Expeditions geological party at Mount Bastion and the Allan Hills in 1982–83.

References

Glaciers of Victoria Land
Willett Range